Jack Austin Harliwich (born 14 July 1930) is a former New Zealand cricketer. He played in one first-class match for Canterbury in 1951/52.

See also
 List of Canterbury representative cricketers

References

External links
 

1930 births
Living people
New Zealand cricketers
Canterbury cricketers
Cricketers from Christchurch